Jeeney AI is a natural language processing  chatterbot.

History
Jeeny AI was named "Best Overall Bot" in the 2009 Chatterbox Challenge, after ranking seventh, but being the "Best New Entry" in the previous year.

Jeeney is modeled on a modified form of Plato's 'Philosopher King' ideal, and remains a non-commercial application available for users to engage with through a text-based interface.

In 2010 Jeeney starred in experimental documentary movie Artificial Insight.

See also
List of chatterbots

References

External links
Jeeney AI Website 

Chatbots